Mouhet is a commune in the Indre department in central France.

Geography
The Anglin flows northwest through the middle of the commune and crosses the village.

Population

See also
Communes of the Indre department

References

Communes of Indre